Maryna Antonivna Aleksiyiva (born 29 May 2001) is a Ukrainian synchronised swimmer. She is World Championships medalist. Vladyslava Aleksiyiva, who is also a synchro swimmer, is her twin sister.

Career
At the 2017 World Aquatics Championships Aleksiiva won a bronze medal in team free routine which became her first major international achievement. The next day she won silver in the combination event.

In the summer of 2018, she was a member of the Ukrainian synchronized swimming team, which became the best at the European Summer Sports Championships.

At the World Aquatics Championships in July 2019 in synchronized swimming, the group, technical program she and Vladislava Alekseeva, Yana Narizhna, Kateryna Reznik, Anastasia Savchuk, Marta Fedina, Alina Shinkarenko, Elizaveta Yakhno won bronze awards. In the highlight program, the team won gold awards.

References

2001 births
Living people
Ukrainian synchronized swimmers
World Aquatics Championships medalists in synchronised swimming
Synchronized swimmers at the 2017 World Aquatics Championships
Artistic swimmers at the 2019 World Aquatics Championships
European Aquatics Championships medalists in synchronised swimming
European Championships (multi-sport event) silver medalists
Sportspeople from Kharkiv Oblast
Synchronized swimmers at the 2020 Summer Olympics
Olympic synchronized swimmers of Ukraine
Olympic bronze medalists for Ukraine
Olympic medalists in synchronized swimming
Medalists at the 2020 Summer Olympics
Artistic swimmers at the 2022 World Aquatics Championships
21st-century Ukrainian women
Twin sportspeople
Ukrainian twins